Fukuia multistriata is a species of amphibious freshwater snail with an operculum, an aquatic gastropod mollusk in the family Pomatiopsidae.

Distribution 
This species is endemic to Honshu, Japan.

Ecology 
This species is a freshwater snail that lives in mountain streamlets. It is also an amphibious snail and it is often arboreal.

References

External links 

Pomatiopsidae
Gastropods described in 1949